Afrikaaps is a South African 2010 documentary film.

Synopsis 
This documentary focuses on a theatre piece entitled Afrikaaps within a film. It is based on the creative processes and performances of the stage production. Using hip-hop the film and the stage play attempt to reclaim Afrikaans – so long considered a language of the oppressor – as a language of liberation. Present from the beginning of the project, Dylan Valley captures revealing moments of the cast's and production crew's personal narratives that transcend what happens on stage.

Awards 
 Encounters International Documentary Festival, South Africa, 2010

External links 

2010 films
South African documentary films
2010 documentary films
Documentary films about theatre